Bastianpillai Paul Nicholas or simply known as B.P. Nicholas was the founder of the Oriental Bank of Malaya and was the first Asian banker in British colonial history. He was also the only ethnic Ceylon Tamil ever to acquire a banking license in Malaya.

References
 The story of the Oriental Bank

Malaysian people of Indian descent
Malaysian people of Sri Lankan Tamil descent
Sri Lankan Tamil businesspeople
Tamil businesspeople
Malaysian people of Tamil descent
Year of birth missing
Place of birth missing
Year of death missing
Malaysian Christians